The Dominic Republic women's national under-20 volleyball team represents Dominic Republic in international women's volleyball competitions and friendly matches under the age 20 and it is ruled by the Dominican Volleyball Federation That Follow the North, Central America and Caribbean Volleyball Confederation NORCECA and also is a part of The Federation of International Volleyball FIVB

Results

FIVB U20 World Championship
 Champions   Runners up   Third place   Fourth place

NORCECA U20 Championship
 Champions   Runners up   Third place   Fourth place

Pan-American U20 Cup
 Champions   Runners up   Third place   Fourth place

Team

Current squad
The following is the Dominican roster in the 2015 FIVB Volleyball Women's U20 World Championship.

Head Coach: Wagner Pacheco

References

External links
 www.fedovoli.org 

Volleyball
National women's under-20 volleyball teams
Volleyball in the Dominican Republic